"Really Doe" is a song by American hip hop recording artist Danny Brown, released as the third single from his fourth studio album, Atrocity Exhibition (2016). It was produced by Black Milk, and features additional verses from fellow American rappers Kendrick Lamar, Ab-Soul and Earl Sweatshirt, with the hook sung by Lamar. It was released on September 20, 2016 by Warp Records.

Background
In an interview with NPR, Danny Brown said: 

In April 2020, during a Twitch stream, Brown detailed his falling out with Ab-Soul after discovering that the track wasn’t just the two of them. According to Brown, Ab-Soul subsequently removed Brown’s verse from the song “Huey Knew THEN” and replaced him with fellow American rapper Da$H. During the stream, Brown also revealed that he initially didn’t intend for anyone to be on the song: “‘Really Doe’ was a song that was done. It was never a posse cut,” he said, explaining that Kendrick Lamar recorded on the track while Brown was out in Los Angeles working with TDE’s MixedByAli. Brown originally had two verses on “Really Doe,” and had wanted Lamar on a different track: “If you listen to that song… I feel like he set up to body me. That’s how I looked at it.” He would go on and turn it into a posse cut including Earl Sweatshirt. Ab-Soul later expressed his displeasure in a tweet that read “Originally ‘Really doe’ was just me n Danny. Had I known we were having company I would've used a different cadence,” referring to how he wrote his verse to compliment Brown’s own verse. Brown also detailed how he had trouble sequencing the verses on “Really Doe” after many of his friends and collaborators claimed Earl Sweatshirt’s verse was “trash” in comparison to the others: “Everybody felt like Kendrick’s verse should go last,” he said. “You know me, I’m a battle rap fan. I’m a rapper fan… Earl bodied all of us.”

Release and promotion 
On September 19, 2016, Peter Rosenberg of New York City-based radio station Hot 97, premiered "Really Doe", after given permission from Danny Brown. "Really Doe" was later released as the album's third and final single via digital distribution on September 20. In an interview, Brown revealed that Kendrick Lamar was responsible for the creation of "Really Doe." On November 1, 2016, a lyric video for "Really Doe" was released. It features clips of live performances from each artist while the lyrics scroll up the screen.

Critical reception
"Really Doe" received critical acclaim from contemporary music critics. The song was chosen upon release as Pitchfork's "Best New Track". Sheldon Pearce stated that, "They rip with reckless abandon. Though they each have their own particular methods—Danny bawls out quick-striking and unorthodox zingers, Ab-Soul imparts stoner wisdom through careful pronunciations, Kendrick winds knotty head-scratchers, and Earl packs dense wordplay in carefully unspooling schemes—they work well as a group, filling the crags of Milk's thwacking production with kinetic flows. "They say I got the city on fire," Kendrick crows on the hook—and honestly, that applies to pretty much everyone here."

Track listing

Release history

References

External links

2016 singles
2016 songs
Earl Sweatshirt songs
Kendrick Lamar songs
Posse cuts
Songs written by Kendrick Lamar
Songs written by Earl Sweatshirt
Warp (record label) singles